Deafnet was created as a demonstration project in 1978 by SRI International (previously known as Stanford Research Institute) at Washington's Gallaudet University for the deaf.  It was funded by The United States Department of Health, Education, and Welfare to demonstrate the advantages of e-mail for deaf people.  Deafnet was the first real use of the telecommunications device for the deaf.

External links
Deafnet at SRI's web site 

Gallaudet University
SRI International